KZZL-FM (99.5 FM) is a radio station broadcasting a country music format.  Licensed to Pullman, Washington, United States, the station is currently owned by Inland Northwest Broadcasting, LLC and features programming from Premiere Radio Networks and Dial Global.

History
The station was assigned the call letters KPNP on March 3, 1987. On April 14, 1989, the station changed its call sign to the current KZZL.

References

External links

ZZL-FM
Country radio stations in the United States
Pullman, Washington